Nortel (previously Northern Telecom) manufactured telephones for business users from the 1980s to 2001, beginning with the Meridian series.

Current phones
Nortel no longer exists. There are no phones being manufactured for, or by, Nortel. Since 2001, phones with the Nortel brand are made by Aastra Technologies Limited of Concord, Ontario.

Previous phones

Nortel's previous phones include:

 Nortel DisplayPhone - early concept business phone
 Nortel SL-1 Digital Office Phone  - early concept business phone
 Nortel Venture 
 Nortel Vista 100 
 Nortel Meridian 9009 
 Nortel Vista 350
 Nortel Vista 390
 Nortel Meridian M2616
 Nortel Meridian 9216 
 Nortel Meridian 9316 
 Nortel Meridian 8417 
 Nortel Meridian Aastra 9417 CW 
 Nortel Meridian 9516 
 rotary outdoor telephone - for call boxes
 Nortel Meridian M3000 Touchphone - world's first production touchphone - a telephone with all indicators and functions managed by a touchscreen.

Switching to VoIP
Due to proprietary digital signalling, VoIP ATA cannot be used for VoIP Enable this Phone. Portico TVA allows 
these phones to seamlessly integrate with softswitches .

See also
 Nortel payphones
 Northern Telecom home phones
 Portico TVA

References

Nortel telephones